Ha Dong-kyun (born June 28, 1980), officially known as Ha Dong Qn, is a South Korean singer-songwriter. He debuted in 2002 as a member of the short-lived boy band 7Dayz, before joining the boy band Wanted in 2004. As a solo singer, he has released two albums: Stand Alone (2006) and Another Corner (2008), and three extended plays: Mark (2012), Word (2014), and Polygon (2017).

Career 
Dong Qn embarked on his career as a solo singer with the release of his first album Stand Alone in 2006. He has since followed his debut album with the release of his second full-length album Another Corner (2008) as well as multiple singles and mini albums including Mark (2012) and Word (2014). Dong Qn attracted substantial audience attention from his appearance on a popular South Korean singing competition TV program I Am a Singer (Season 3, aired in 2015). In 2016, Ha Dong Qn founded the independent record label Mark Planet, under which he then released his new mini album Polygon, consisting of five single tracks, on May 11, 2017. Getting rave reviews for his new album, he held a very successful first solo concert Night: The First on June 4, 2017, and continued advancing his career by participating in a variety of popular music events, such as the Someday Festival in Seoul, the Yoo Jae-ha Music Contest, and several benefit performances for people in need. He successfully put on the second concert of his solo concert series, 02 Night: Secret Room, on December 10, 2017, and has since followed that up with more TV appearances, his participation in the Kim Kwang-seok Memorial Concert series (김광석 다시부르기), and other live performances. 

He released single named "그때 우린" on April 18, 2019, declaring the news of a soon-to be-released new album.

Discography

Studio albums

Extended plays

Singles

Soundtrack appearances

Other charted songs

Radio
 Radio Days, It's Ha Dong Qn, DJ, Apr. 2008 ~ Apr. 2009

 MBC FM4U, Ha Dong Qn's Golden Disk, special DJ, May 2~3rd. 2016

 MBC FM4U, Blue Night, It's Ha Dong Qn, Special DJ, Jan 26~29th. 2017

 MBC FM4U, Blue Night, Special DJ, Sep 25~30th. 2018

TV appearances
 I Am a Singer, Season 3, Jan–Apr 2015
 Mix Nine, November 19, 2017 – January 26, 2018
 I Can See Your Voice, Season 5, April 6, 2018
 The Call, Season 2, Epi.3–10, 2019
 I Can See Your Voice, Season 8,  February 19, 2021
Begin Again - Intermission, Cast Member, spin-off, January 6, 2023

Concerts

 Ha Dong Qn's 1st solo concert, <Below The Surface>, 2011. Sep 17
 Concert for the 3rd album of Wanted, <back to vintage>, 2012. Mar 31
 Ha Dong Qn's solo concert <MARK>, 2013. Dec 31
 Ha Dong Qn's solo concert <WORD>, 2014. Nov 22
 Joint concert of Kim Tae-woo, Baek Ji-young, Ha Dong Qn, <VOICE TO VOICE>, 2014. Dec 24
 Joint Christmas concert of Moon Myung-jin, Ha Dong Qn, Young-ji, <Wishes>, 2014. Dec 26
 Joint concert of Ha Dong Qn, Moon Myung-jin, Young-ji, <Spring Breeze>, 2015. May 16, May 30
 2015 Seoul Jazz Festival, 2015. May 23, 24, 25
 2015 Someday Festival, 2015. Dec 5
 2015 SMF (Special Music Festival), 2015. Sep 6
 Joint Concert of Shin Young-jae, Ha Dong Qn, Young-ji, <Memories>, 2015. Nov 22
 Ha Dong Qn's solo concert <#Blank>, 2015. Nov 29
LOUDers FAMILY CONCERT, 2015. Dec 12
 HI CONCERT 2016. Feb 12~14
 Hyundai Card Curated 32 – Ha Dong Qn solo concert, 2017 Jan 20~21
 Ha Dong Qn's solo concert <Night: the First>, 2017. Jun 3~4
 2017 Someday Festival, 2017. Sep 16
 Ha Dong Qn's solo concert <#02 Night: Secret Room>, 2017. Dec 8~10
 Kim Kwang-seok Memorial Concert, 2018 2.3/ 2.10/ 2.24
 Ha Dong Qn's solo concert <Far Closer>, 2018. Mar 31
 May I Love You (book concert), 2018. May 12
 YONSEI Lock (university festival), 2018. May 25
 Angel-in-us Rooftop Coffee Concert (Busan), 2018. Jun 23
 2018 Someday Festival, 2018. Sep 1
 2018 Solo Concert, < Ha Dong Qn >, 2018. Dec 8~9
 Live On Stage, <Ha Dong-Qn × Son Seung-Yeon>, 2018. Dec 26 
 2018 Jazz Festival, Stage 5, <Secret Party in Busan>, 2018. Dec 28
 2019 Solo Concert <Begin>, 2019. Apr 13~14th, Apr 27~28th.
 Yeungnam Univ. Festival, 2019. May 24
 Soribada, 2019 K-WORLD FESTA, K-SOUL, 2019. Aug 18
 JEJU Samda Park Night Concert, 2019. Aug 23 
 2019 Someday Festival, 2019. Aug 31
 2019 Dodong Seowon Concert (to celebrate the confucian academy was designated as an UNESCO World Heritage World Heritage Site), TV Chosun, 2019. Sep 21 
 2019 Gotjawal Forest Concert in Jeju, 2019. Sep 28
 Hot & Blue Concert, U.S.(CA) 2019. Oct 19
 2019 Korean Popular Culture And Art Awards, Special Performance, 2019. Oct 30
 2019 8th GLAD MUSIC FEST in Jeju, < Ha Dong Qn × Punch >, 2019. Nov 24
 2019 Solo Concert <h.ealing>, 2019. Dec 7–8
 2020 Daegu Folk Festival, 2020. Jul 30
 2020 Oesol Hangeul Hanmadang, 2020. Oct 9
 Cinema Concert 2020, 2020. Nov 6 
 6th KIM HYUN SIK MUSIC FESTA, 2020. Nov 20
 Appreciation Concert for Medical Staffs, 2020. Nov 24
 Junggu Culture Joint Concert 2020, 2020. Nov 25
 2021 SOMEDAY THEATRE CANTABILE, 2021. May 23
 Jeonju Int'l Sori Festival, Starlight Concert, Sep 30 
 2021 Solo Concert <Here I Am>, 2021. Oct 15–17
 2021 SOMEDAY THEATRE LAST CANTABILE, 2021. Nov 6

References

External links

 M.AR.K PLANET Website
 Instagram
 Official Insta

1980 births
Living people
South Korean contemporary R&B singers
South Korean television personalities
21st-century South Korean  male singers